Bhadla is a village in Jasdan Taluka of Rajkot district, Gujarat, India. It is about 40 kilometer via lili sajdiyali and 45 kilometer via sardhar south-east of Rajkot.

History
During the British Raj, Bhadla was the chief town of the small mahal of the same name, and, also called bhadla chovisi like Atkot, was originally a Kathi holding, but was acquired by Nawanagar State during the time of Meraman Khavas.

The Bhadla (vid) grassland is very large. It yields about 10,000,000 pulies or bundles of grass in a good year.
Bhadla is very popular, There is a big temple of Goddess "Gel" in Hindu in Bhadla. 
BHADLA was earlier known as BHADRAPURI. (JD_Bike _Riders), here built vaav about 12th century by rajmata minal devi modher of sidhraj jaysinh gujrat no nath.
 Bhadla is a big village in Jasdan Taluka.

References

 This article incorporates text from a publication now in the public domain: 

Villages in Rajkot district